Catherine 'Kate' Charlotte Maberly (1805 – 7 February 1875) was an Irish writer.

Biography
Born Catherine Charlotte Prittie in November 1805 in Corville, Tipperary, Ireland, Maberly was the daughter of Hon. Francis Aldborough Prittie and Elizabeth Ponsonby. Her brother Henry Prittie became the 3rd Baron Dunalley of Kilboy when their uncle, Henry Sadleir Prittie, died childless.  She married William Leader Maberly on 11 November 1830.

Maberly was a novelist who wrote predominantly historical fiction though she also wrote some non fiction. Maberley's  1851 novel The Lady and the Priest is about the life of King Henry II of England, and his relationships with his mistress Rosamund Clifford, and his antagonist, Thomas à Becket.

She is buried in Cowes on the Isle of Wight with her only son, William Anson Robert Maberly.

Bibliography
 Display
 The locket ; or, the history of Mr. Singleton 
 Emily, or the Countess of Rosendale
 The lady and the priest. An historical romance
 Fashion and Its Votaries
 The Present State of Ireland and Its Remedy
 Leonora
 The art of conversation with remarks on fashion and address
 Leontine, or the Court of Louis the fifteenth
 The Grand Vizier's daughter. An historical romance of the fifteenth century
 Melanthe; Or the Days of the Medici
 A day near Turin : an opera in two acts
 The Love-Match

References

1805 births
1875 deaths
19th-century Irish novelists
19th-century Irish women writers
Irish historical novelists
Writers of historical fiction set in the Middle Ages
Women historical novelists
Daughters of barons